Diego Gabriel Chávez (born 24 September 1997) is an Argentine professional footballer who plays as a midfielder for Colegiales.

Career
Having come through the youth ranks at Independiente from 2008, Chávez started his senior career in 2018 with Primera B Metropolitana side Colegiales. He made his professional debut on 6 October 2018 in a home loss to Almirante Brown, with his first goal arriving in the subsequent month against Talleres. Later in the season, on 27 January 2019, Chávez netted a brace in a 2–0 victory over Acassuso. He received two red cards across the next two months against San Telmo and Defensores Unidos respectively.

Career statistics
.

References

External links

1997 births
Living people
Sportspeople from Chaco Province
Argentine footballers
Association football midfielders
Primera B Metropolitana players
Club Atlético Colegiales (Argentina) players